The VIVA World Cup is an international football tournament organized by the New Federation Board, an umbrella association for nations unaffiliated with FIFA. A women's tournament played as a two-legged match was organized in 2008 and 2010.

History

Sápmi 2008 
The first edition, with only two teams, was won by the host, Sápmi, who beat Kurdistan over two legs with an aggregate score of 15 – 1.

All times are Central European Summer Time (UTC+2)

Gozo 2010
The second edition, again with only two teams, was won by Padania, who beat the host Gozo over two legs with an aggregate score of 7 – 0.

See also 
 Island Games
 Non-FIFA football

References

External links 
 Official Site
 Official forum

Women's World Cup
Women's World Cup
World Cup